Erin Hope Routliffe (born April 11, 1995) is a New Zealand professional tennis player who previously represented Canada.

She reached a career-high doubles ranking of world No. 29 on 8 August 2022. She studied at the University of Alabama and was part of their tennis team from September 2013 until her graduation in May 2017, majoring in public relations. Routliffe is a two-time NCAA doubles champion with Maya Jansen for the 2014 and 2015 seasons. She had a career-high junior rank of No. 17 achieved on 21 January 2013.

Her win in the 2018 Hardee's Pro Classic in Dothan, Alabama allowed her to break into the top 200 in the doubles rankings for the first time, while her win two weeks later in Charleston, South Carolina pushed her into the top 150. Her runner-up finish at the Washington Open took her into the top 100. Her first WTA doubles title came at the 32nd Palermo Ladies Open in July 2021. Partnered with Alicja Rosolska, Routliffe reached the quarterfinals at Wimbledon in 2022 for her best result at a Grand Slam event, having reached the quarterfinals in the 2022 Australian Open mixed doubles with Michael Venus.

Early life
Routliffe was born in New Zealand while her parents, Robert Routliffe and Catherine MacLennan, were on an around-the-world sailing adventure. They stayed there four years before returning to Canada. She has two sisters, Tara and Tess, the latter being an international paraswimmer. She made the move to Montreal in September 2011 to train at the National Training Centre and stayed there until 2013.

Tennis career

2010–11
In October 2010, Routliffe won the doubles title at the G4 in Burlington. She won her first junior singles title at the same tournament a year later. In October 2011, she reached the quarterfinals in both singles and doubles at the ITF $50k in Saguenay, with a win over then world No. 229, Alizé Lim, in the second round. She reached her second straight $50k doubles quarterfinal in Toronto the next week.

2012
In April, Routliffe won the singles and doubles titles at the G2 in Cap-d'Ail. Later that month she made the doubles final of the G1 in Beaulieu-sur-Mer. She lost in the first round in singles at the junior French Open and Wimbledon, but reached the quarterfinals in doubles at Wimbledon. In August, she was awarded a wildcard in the qualifying draw at the Rogers Cup and made it to the second round. She made the doubles final of the G1 in Repentigny in September. She was defeated in the first round in singles of the junior US Open, but reached the quarterfinals in doubles. She won the doubles title at the GB1 in Tulsa alongside compatriot Carol Zhao, overcoming Charlotte Petrick and Denise Starr in the final. Routliffe also reached two doubles quarterfinals in October, at the $50k tournaments in Saguenay and Toronto.

2013
Routliffe lost in the first round in singles of the junior Australian Open, but made the quarterfinals in doubles for her third straight Grand Slam. In February, she reached her first professional doubles final, at the $25k tournament in Launceston. She was defeated in the first round in singles and the second round in doubles at the junior French Open. At the beginning of July, Routliffe made it to the semifinals in doubles at the $50k Cooper Challenger. In August she won the gold medal in singles at the Canada Summer Games in Sherbrooke.

2014
In July, Routliffe and partner Carol Zhao made it to the semifinals at the $25k Challenger de Gatineau. At the $25k in Granby a week later, she and Zhao reached the third professional doubles final of her career. They were supposed to face Hiroko Kuwata and Riko Sawayanagi for the title, but had to withdraw because of an injury.

2015
In July, Routliffe reached the doubles final in Granby (now a $50k tournament) for the second straight year, this time with Laura Robson, but they were defeated in straight sets by Australians Jessica Moore and Storm Sanders. The following month, Routliffe and partner Maya Jansen won the US Open National Playoffs in doubles, and were awarded a wildcard for the main draw. They were defeated in the first round by sixth seeds Raquel Kops-Jones and Abigail Spears.

2016
Routliffe advanced to her first professional singles final in July 2016, at the $25k in Winnipeg, where she was defeated by fellow qualifier Francesca Di Lorenzo in straight sets. In early October, she won her first professional doubles title, partnering Andie Daniell, at the $10k event in Charleston.

2017
In June, after a lengthy process, the ITF agreed to allow Routliffe to change her representational nationality to the country of her birth. Routliffe played her first Fed Cup ties for New Zealand against Turkmenistan and Uzbekistan in July, dropping only one game in her winning debut over Guljan Muhammetkuliyeva. In October, this time with Di Lorenzo as her partner, she won through to the doubles final at the $60k in Saguenay, Canada, but they had to withdraw following an injury to Di Lorenzo. The next week at a $60k in Toronto, she won her second doubles title, defeating Ysaline Bonaventure and Victoria Rodríguez, partnering Alexa Guarachi for just the second time. In December, she reached the doubles final with Maya Jansen at the $15k in Solapur, India.

2018
In January, with compatriot Jade Lewis, Routliffe won her third and fourth doubles titles, in consecutive weeks at ITF tournaments in Sharm El Sheikh. A week later, she collected her third successive title at the same venue, this time in singles over Nadja Gilchrist.

Routliffe then joined the New Zealand team in Bahrain for their Fed Cup Asia/Oceania Group II playoffs. Rested for the first day's tie against Lebanon, Routliffe had her first match the following day when New Zealand met top seeds Uzbekistan. Playing for the second time against their top player, Sabina Sharipova (she had played her in the 2017 Fed Cup tie as well), Routliffe fought well in the first set but tired in the second, losing 7–5, 6–1. Losing all three rubbers, New Zealand nevertheless finished second in the group, and moved through to the 5th-8th place play-offs against Pakistan the following day, where Routliffe beat Ushna Sohail, 6–3, 6–1. The tie was won 3–0, New Zealand therefore finishing fifth equal with the Philippines.

In Irapuato, Mexico, Routliffe won her third ITF doubles title for the year when she teamed up with Alexa Guarachi again. It was also the third final in a row where she had been in a team which defeated the top seeds. They followed that with a loss in the semifinals at Jackson, Mississippi, but won another title together a week after that, in Pelham, Alabama, and continued the great run of form by collecting their third title in four weeks, this time in Dothan. The latter event, being an $80k tournament, was the biggest win for both players. They lost in a marathon match tie-break, 20–18, in the quarterfinals of the next tournament in the $80k series, at Charlottesville, Virginia, but then prevailed again in the last of the three events, at Charleston, South Carolina, where they beat Louisa Chirico and Allie Kiick in a match tie-break in the final.

Routliffe then went to South Korea to start a series of tournaments in Asia. With a new partner in Victoria Rodríguez, as Guarachi stayed at home, she lost in the semifinals of the first event in Incheon. Moving on to Thailand, the pair took out the title at the first tournament they played in Hua Hin, and completed the tournament double by winning again a week later. It was Routliffe's eighth doubles title for the year.

Routliffe and Guarachi took a chance that they would be able to qualify for Wimbledon, and became the last team entered. They had straight sets wins over Priscilla Hon and Arantxa Rus, and Anna Kalinskaya and Viktoria Kuzmova, in the qualifying matches, before taking the eventual champions, Barbora Krejčíková and Kateřina Siniaková, to a third set in the first round of the main draw, the score being 6–2, 2–6, 6–2 to the young Czechs.

From there Routliffe returned to Canada and, because Guarachi had remained in Europe, she teamed up again with Victoria Rodriguez for an ITF tournament in Gatineau, Quebec. Entering the event as top seeds, they were surprisingly beaten in their quarterfinal. Teaming up again with Guarachi as fourth seeds at the Washington Open, her very first WTA event, they made it all the way to the final, where they lost in straight sets to third seeds Han Xinyun and Darija Jurak. Returning to Canada with Guarachi, they were beaten in a big upset by Carson Branstine and Rebecca Marino in the first round of an ITF tournament in Vancouver.

Routliffe followed that with a month-long training block in New Zealand before heading to Cairns for the first of a series of ITF tournaments in Australia. Beaten in singles qualifying, she and first-time partner Astra Sharma were second seeds in the doubles, and performed right up to that ranking. They met the top seeds Naiktha Bains and Xu Shilin in the final and, after a poor first set, couldn't convert either of their set points in the second set tie-break, eventually losing 1–6, 6–7. In Darwin, she and Ellen Perez lost in the quarterfinals. She had better luck with Freya Christie as her partner, reaching the semifinals in Brisbane and taking her ninth doubles title of the year in Toowoomba, but lost with different partners in the first round in both Bendigo and Canberra.

Returning to the US for her final WTA tournament of the season, Routliffe teamed up again with regular partner Alexa Guarachi for a WTA 125 event in Houston, Texas. Seeded fourth, and playing in a temperature of just 4 °C, they were beaten in a huge first round upset by Maegan Manasse and Jessica Pegula, who would go on to win the title. A month later Routliffe was in Auckland where, seeded second in the singles, she lost in the semifinals of the New Zealand Championships to Valentina Ivanov, but won the doubles as top seed with Paige Hourigan.

2019
Given a wildcard into singles qualifying in Auckland, Routliffe was beaten in straight sets by Alexandra Panova. She and Guarachi took the first set against Timea Babos and Julia Görges in the doubles, but were unable to hold out the European pair in either the second set or match tie-break. They both went on to Hobart but took different partners, with Routliffe and Vera Lapko losing 11–13 in a match tie-break in the first round. Travelling back to North America, Routliffe's next event was the Newport Beach Challenger in California, where she and Kristie Ahn lost in the first round to their conquerors from Houston, Manasse and Pegula.

She then had a series of tournaments where she lost in either the first or second round, until she came to defend her title in Irapuato.  She and Anna Danilina were top seeds, but were upset in the semifinals, 7–6, 6–4, by the eventual champions, fellow New Zealander Paige Hourigan and Australian Astra Sharma. She lost in the quarterfinals of her next two tournaments in Mexico, and then in the first round of the WTA tournament in Bogota.

From there it was to the U.S. clay-court swing where, reunited with Alexa Guarachi, they attempted to defend their title in Dothan, but were upset in the first round by Beatrice Gumulya and Abbie Myers. Guarachi then returned to the WTA Tour in Europe, so Routliffe teamed up with Francesca Di Lorenzo to reach the quarterfinals in Charlottesville, and then with Allie Kiick to reach the semifinals at the next event in Charleston. These events had all had an increase in their prizemoney to $100k in 2019, and a fourth event at that level, in Bonita Springs, Florida, was added to the circuit.  Guarachi returned to join Routliffe for this tournament, and they took the title to give Routliffe the biggest win in her career.

A semi-final loss in Spain was followed by a first-round exit at Surbiton and then a defeat in the quarterfinals at Nottingham to Monica Niculescu and Elena-Gabriela Ruse, in a match which was halted for an hour by rain at the end of the first set.  Routliffe then flew to Kuala Lumpur for New Zealand's 2019 Fed Cup Group II tournament. Three easy wins in the round-robin doubles rubbers were followed by a three set victory over Malaysia in the play-offs, although New Zealand lost the tie.

Routliffe was straight back on a flight to London, where she teamed up with Madison Brengle for Wimbledon. They were just centimetres from victory in the first round when Routliffe hit the third of four match points in the second set fractionally over the baseline, but 35 minutes later it was all over, Han Xinyun and Oksana Kalashnikova having run away with the deciding set. First or second round losses followed in Routliffe's next four tournaments, and it wasn't until she teamed up with Naomi Broady in Vancouver that she reached another final, although they lost to Nao Hibino and Miyu Kato in straight sets. She would play only once more in 2019 after taking a long training block in New Zealand, losing in the first round in Toronto at the end of October to Broady and Hayley Carter when playing with Di Lorenzo.

2020
Routliffe was given wildcards for both the qualifying singles and doubles at the Auckland Open. She lost her first singles match to Sara Errani, and she and Allie Kiick lost a tight match tie-break to Caroline Garcia and Julia Görges in the first round of doubles.

Her next stop was an ITF tournament in Burnie, where she was the subject of one of the stranger happenings in recent times. She had to retire from her second round singles qualifying match against Irina Ramialison with what turned out to be a mild case of food poisoning. Not only did she end up in the main draw as a lucky loser, she was drawn to face Ramialison again. This time she was able to win in straight sets, but she lost her second round match to Maddison Inglis. She partnered Fanny Stollár in the doubles, and they lost their quarterfinal against Paige Hourigan and Destanee Aiava in a long match tie-break. Routliffe and Stollar had two match points at 9–7, and two more later, but lost on Hourigan and Aiava's third match point, the decider finishing at 15–13.

The New Zealanders then flew back to Wellington for their Fed Cup tournament. Routliffe played only doubles, winning all three of her round-robin matches with different partners each time. The ITF Circuit resumed in New Zealand after a break of seven years, the first women's event being in Hamilton. Routliffe and Emily Fanning, ranked a long way above any other pair, justified their top seeding with easy wins all the way through to the doubles title.

Two tournaments in Perth followed, with Routliffe losing in the first round of singles in the first week, and in the final qualifying round in the second. She and Jaimee Fourlis were beaten finalists in the first doubles event, but Routliffe had to default in the quarter-finals in the second week when her partner, Arina Rodionova, was injured playing singles. The latter had recovered by the time they moved to Mildura for the following week, and they got through to the final, losing to Tereza Mihalíková and Abbie Myers. This was Routliffe's last match before the international tours were suspended due to the COVID-19 pandemic.

Playing doubles only, Routliffe resumed in the first tournament after the break, the Lexington Challenger (with Robin Anderson), but lost in the first round, as she did in Prague (with Ingrid Neel), the tournament replacing the qualifying events for the US Open. She and Naomi Broady got to the quarterfinals of the Istanbul Cup, but she and Neel had another first round defeat when they played in Cagnes-sur-Mer.

There was a much better result when Routliffe went to Porto, where she and Jana Fett were runners-up in a $25k tournament, and she equalled that result when she and Jamie Loeb were runners-up in Orlando, beaten 11–9 in a match tie-break by Rasheeda McAdoo and Alycia Parks after holding five match points at 9–4. That was Routliffe's final match for the year.

2021: US Open third round & Maiden WTA title in doubles 
Routliffe began the new year with ITF tournaments in Rome, Georgia, and Newport Beach, California. She won her first singles qualifying match in Rome with a 16–14 match tie-break, one of the longest in women's tennis, and lost in the doubles quarterfinals at both events. Her first WTA Tour match of the year was in Bogotá, where she and Viktoriya Tomova lost to top seeds Arantxa Rus and Tamara Zidanšek in the first round after leading 8–2 in the deciding match tie-break.

2022: Major & WTA 1000 quarterfinals, WTA title, top 30 debut
In January 2022, she reached the semifinals of the Adelaide International 2 with new partner Alicja Rosolska.

They reached the quarterfinals on the WTA 1000 level at the Qatar Open and the Miami Open.
The pair also reached two more finals at the WTA 500 St. Petersburg Ladies' Trophy and the WTA 250 Bad Homburg Open.

On her debut at the French Open, she reached the third round for the first time in her career with Rosolska. She reunited with Rosolska for the Wimbledon Championships where she reached the quarterfinals seeded 11th for the first time at a major becoming the first woman from New Zealand since Marina Erakovic to reach the last eight in 2011 at the All England Club.
She made her top 30 debut at world No. 29 on 8 August 2022 following her title at the Washington Open, partnering Jessica Pegula.

Returning to New Zealand for her first tournaments in nearly three years, she and Paige Hourigan won the doubles title at the inaugural $25k Eves Open in Papamoa, just outside Tauranga.

Grand Slam doubles performance timeline

WTA career finals

Doubles: 9 (3 titles, 6 runner-ups)

WTA Challenger finals

Doubles: 1 (runner-up)

ITF Circuit finals

Singles: 2 (1 title, 1 runner-up)

Doubles: 28 (15 titles, 13 runner-ups)

Note 1: rain stopped play on 12 October with the score at 1–3 in the first set, and also prevented play the following day. The match was completed on 14 October.

Fed Cup/Billie Jean King Cup participation

Singles (4–2)

Doubles (10–4)

Notes

References

External links
 
 
 
Alabama Crimson Tide profile

1995 births
Living people
New Zealand female tennis players
Canadian female tennis players
People from Caledon, Ontario
Racket sportspeople from Ontario
Tennis players from Auckland
Alabama Crimson Tide women's tennis players